Ilkhchi District is in Osku County, East Azerbaijan province, Iran. At the 2006 National Census, its population was 27,808 in 7,705 households. The following census in 2011 counted 29,872 people in 9,068 households. At the latest census in 2016, the district had 30,818 inhabitants in 10,088 households.

References 

Osku County

Districts of East Azerbaijan Province

Populated places in East Azerbaijan Province

Populated places in Osku County